Anophiodes concentratus is a species of moth of the family Erebidae. It is found in Papua New Guinea.

References

Moths described in 1914
Anophiodes
Moths of New Guinea